Venicia Considine is an American politician serving as a member of the Nevada Assembly from the 18th district. Considine was elected to the Nevada Assembly in November 2020.

Considine was born in Queens, New York.

References

1969 births
Living people
University of Nevada, Las Vegas alumni
Democratic Party members of the Nevada Assembly
21st-century American politicians
21st-century American women politicians
Politicians from Queens, New York